Events in the year 1803 in India.

Events
National income - ₹11,369 million
11 September – Battle of Delhi, during the Second Anglo-Maratha War, between British troops under General Lake, and the Marathas of Scindia's army under General Louis Bourquin.
17 October – Agra was stormed by the forces commanded by Lord Lake.

Law

References

 
India
Years of the 19th century in India